Dario Violi (Costa Volpino, 4 May 1985) is an Italian politician.

Biography 
He served as Lombard regional councilor from 2013 to 2018 in the 10th term of the Regional Council as a member of Five Star Movement (M5S). Violi ran for the Presidency of Lombardy in the 2018 regional election, against Attilio Fontana (LN, supported by the center-right coalition) and Giorgio Gori (PD, supported by center-left coalition).  On 4 March Fontana won 50% (Gori 29%, Violi 17%) in the Regional election. Violi was compared by media with Alessandro Di Battista and called "il Dibba lombardo" (the lombard Di Battista). Viola was confirmed as Lombard regional councilor in the 11th term (2018-2023). Dario Viola is married with Laura and they have 2 children. He is graduated in Political Science and lives in Bergamo.

References

External links
  Dario Violi - Regione Lombardia
  Dario Violi - M5S Lombardia

1985 births
Living people
Politicians from Bergamo
21st-century Italian politicians